Claiton dos Santos may refer to:
Claiton Alberto Fontoura dos Santos, Brazilian footballer
Claiton Machado dos Santos, Brazilian footballer